Little Miss Millions (re-released in 1994 as Home for Christmas) is a 1993 American comedy film directed by Jim Wynorski and starring Jennifer Love Hewitt.

Synopsis 
Heather Lofton is nine years old. She comes from a very rich family, but somehow she's not so lucky; in fact, her stepmother can't stand her. Heather is forced to escape away from home, searching for her real mother. The woman Heather has been put in the care of hires a bounty hunter to find her. But in the process, she frames him, and he becomes wanted for kidnapping her.

Cast 
 Jennifer Love Hewitt as Heather Lofton (as Love Hewitt)
 Howard Hesseman as Nick Frost
 Anita Morris as Sybil Lofton
 James Avery as the Agent Noah Hollander
 Robert Fieldsteel as Agent Bellows
 Steve Landesberg as Harvey Lipschitz
 Terri Treas as Susan Ferris
 Paul Hertzberg as Delbert Botts
 Lenny Juliano as Legs Dooley
 Toni Naples as Biker Chick

References

External links 
 
 

1993 films
1993 comedy films
1990s English-language films
American comedy films
Films scored by Joel Goldsmith
Films about children
Films directed by Jim Wynorski
1990s American films